General Council elections were held in Chad on 15 December 1946, with a second round of voting on 12 January 1947.

Background
The French Constituent Assembly elected in 1945 passed law 46.972 on 9 May 1946, creating a 36-member General Council for Chad. The Council would be elected by a single college by majority vote in one round. There would be two constituencies, each electing 18 seats. The southern constituency would cover Logone, Mayo-Kebbi and Moyen Chari, and a northern constituency covering the rest of the territory. However, the law was not promulgated in French Equatorial Africa.

Shortly before the end of its mandate, the new Constituent Assembly elected in June 1946 passed law 46.2152 on 7 October 1946, which annulled law 46.972 and gave the provisional government the power to create representative assemblies by decree. This was duly used by Prime Minister Georges Bidault to issue decree 46.2374 on 25 October 1946, creating general councils for the territories of French Equatorial Africa.

Electoral system
Decree 46.2374 provided for a 30-seat General Council, with a term of five years. Ten seats were elected by a First College consisting of French citizens with civil status and twenty by a Second College comprising citizens with personal status or those from areas under French administration (i.e. Cameroon and French Togoland). The elections were held using the two-round system, with candidates required to receive a majority of the vote (and for their vote share to be higher than 25% of the registered electorate) to be elected in the first round. In the second round only a plurality was needed.

Order 3267 on 18 November 1946 created the constituencies used, with seats allocated based on population rather than the number of registered voters:

Results

First College
In the North constituency all four seats were won in the first round by the Republican Union of Chad candidates, with the Union of Left Republicans candidates receiving between 58 and 62 votes. In the South-West constituency, two candidates from Albert Blanchard's Independent List were elected in the first round, forcing a second round of voting to decide the other four seats, with Blanchard himself failing to be elected in the first round. Blanchard's list was competing with a second independent list and the Republican Union of Chad. In the second round the best-placed candidate of the second independent list received only 79 votes.

Second College
In the Second College, electoral manipulation by the French authorities resulted in conservative candidates winning 13 of the 20 seats. The African Democratic Bloc of Ouaddaï (BADO) filed a complaint, which led to an official inspection. Although the report found a disproportionately high voter turnout in the district of Biltine, Chad and that BADO had obtained the majority of votes in Abéché, the result was not overturned.

Elected MPs

Aftermath
Following the elections, three distinct political groups emerged in the Second College; members of the Chadian-French Progressive List (7 seats), Republican Union (four seats) and Franco-Chadian Progressive Group (unrepresented) formed the Chadian Democratic Union (UDT). A group which later became the Chadian Progressive Party (PPT) was formed by the Progressive and Republican Union of Chad (six seats), BADO and the Communist list (both unrepresented). The third group was made up of the three independents; Adoum Aganaye joined the PPT, whilst Kadre Alio and Arabi el Goni joined the UDT, giving the UDT thirteen seats and the PPT seven.

The General Council met for the first time on 30 January 1947 at 8am, when its first session was opened by Governoer Jacques Rogué.

References

Chad
Chad
Elections in Chad
1946 in Chad
1947 in Chad
December 1946 events in Africa
January 1947 events in Africa